Omar Berdiýew (25 June 1979 – 6 January 2023) was a Turkmenistan footballer who played as a defender. Berdiýew was a member of the Turkmenistan national team. He died on 6 January 2023, at the age of 43.

Career statistics
Score and result list Turkmenistan's goal tally first, score column indicates score after Berdiýew goal.

References

External links

1979 births
2023 deaths
Expatriate footballers in Kazakhstan
Turkmenistan footballers
Turkmenistan expatriate footballers
Turkmenistan international footballers
2004 AFC Asian Cup players
FC Metalist Kharkiv players
FC Shakhter Karagandy players
FC Atyrau players
FC Kyzylzhar players
FC AGMK players
Turkmenistan expatriate sportspeople in Kazakhstan
Turkmenistan expatriate sportspeople in Ukraine
Expatriate footballers in Ukraine
Turkmenistan expatriate sportspeople in Uzbekistan
Expatriate footballers in Uzbekistan
Turkmenistan expatriate sportspeople in Azerbaijan
Expatriate footballers in Azerbaijan
FK Dinamo Samarqand players
FK Karvan players
Association football defenders